Amazonides is a genus of moths of the family Noctuidae. The genus was described by David Stephen Fletcher in 1961.

Species
Amazonides ascia D. S. Fletcher, 1961
Amazonides asciodes Berio, 1972
Amazonides atrisigna (Hampson, 1911)
Amazonides atrisignoides Laporte, 1974
Amazonides aulombardi Hacker & Legrain, 2002
Amazonides axyliaesimilis (Berio, 1939)
Amazonides berliozi Laporte, 1974
Amazonides bioculata Berio, 1974
Amazonides confluxa (Saalmuller, 1891)
Amazonides dividens (Walker, 1857)
Amazonides dubiomeodes Laporte, 1977
Amazonides ecstrigata (Hampson, 1903)
Amazonides elaeopis (Hampson, 1907)
Amazonides epipyria (Hampson, 1903)
Amazonides fumicolor (Hampson, 1902)
Amazonides fuscirufa (Hampson, 1903)
Amazonides griseofusca (Hampson, 1913)
Amazonides intermedia Berio, 1972
Amazonides invertita Berio, 1962
Amazonides koffoleense Laporte, 1977
Amazonides laheuderiae Laporte, 1984
Amazonides menieri Laporte, 1974
Amazonides pseudoberliozi Rougeot & Laporte, 1983
Amazonides putrefacta (Guenée, 1852)
Amazonides rufescens (Hampson, 1913)
Amazonides ruficeps (Hampson, 1903)
Amazonides rufomixta (Hampson, 1903)
Amazonides tabida (Guenée, 1852)
Amazonides ustula (Hampson, 1913)
Amazonides zarajokobi Laporte, 1984

References

Noctuinae
Noctuoidea genera